Monte Cassino School is a Catholic elementary and middle school located in midtown Tulsa, Oklahoma. The school also included a girls' junior college until 1945  and a high school until 1986.

History
It was founded in 1926 by the Benedictine Sisters as a girls' school and junior college.  In the early 1960s, Monte Cassino terminated its boarding school, and its residence hall became the new home for the sisters of the St. Joseph Monastery.

When the high school closed a preschool opened and the educational institute adopted co-education for its middle school.  At the same time, the neighboring Catholic boys' school, Cascia Hall Preparatory School, began admitting girls in middle school and high school, effectively absorbing Monte Cassino's role as a girls' high school.  (The two schools had shared some classes in previous years.)

Notable alumni
 Actress Jennifer Jones attended Monte Cassino and graduated from the junior college in 1936 before continuing her education at Northwestern University.
 Actress, model, and current Miss USA titleholder Olivia Jordan attended Monte Cassino and graduated from the middle school in 2003.

Cultural references
The school provides a frequent location for the House of Night book series by P.C. and Kristin Cast.

References

External links
 Monte Cassino official website

Private middle schools in Oklahoma
Benedictine schools
Educational institutions established in 1926
Catholic elementary schools in the United States
Private elementary schools in Oklahoma
Schools in Tulsa, Oklahoma
Former Catholic universities and colleges in the United States
Former women's universities and colleges in the United States
1926 establishments in Oklahoma
History of women in Oklahoma